The Kaumajet Mountains are a dramatic compact mountain range rising directly out of the sea on the northern Labrador coast. The mountain range has one  peak, the highest island peak on the east coast of North America between the Caribbean and Hudson Strait, and several peaks with very high prominence.

See also
 List of mountain ranges

External links
 

Labrador
Mountain ranges of Newfoundland and Labrador